Sheev Palpatine is a fictional character in the Star Wars franchise, the main antagonist of the Skywalker saga.

Palpatine may also refer to:

 Palpatine family is a fictional family in the Star Wars series, specifically the Skywalker saga.
 Supreme Leader Snoke (character), clone of Sheev
 Rey Palpatine (character), scavenger, Jedi, honorary Skywalker and paternal granddaughter of Sheev
 The Palpatine Saga (story arc), the nine central canon films that comprise the rise and fall of the Palpatines 
 "Palpatine" (short story), a Star Wars short story set before the Battle of Yavin, collected in the 2017 anthology From a Certain Point of View; see List of Star Wars books

See also

 Eye of Palpatine (Star Wars), fictional warship 
 "Peev Shalpatine" (2017 song), song by Jarrod Allonge, off the album Awkward & Depressed
 Silent Palpatine (character), nickname of Darth Jay from the 2003 animated film Trooper Clerks